In the Middle Ages, efforts were made in order to establish a single Christian state of Pan-Christianity by uniting the countries within Christendom. Christian nationalism may have played a role in this era in which Christians felt the impulse to recover lands in which Christianity flourished. After the rise of Islam, certain parts of North Africa, East Asia, Southern Europe, Central Asia, and the Middle East lost Christian control. In response, Christians across national borders mobilized militarily and a "wave of Christian reconquest achieved the recovery of Spain, Portugal, and southern Italy, but was unable to recover North Africa nor—from a Christian point of view, most painful of all—the Holy Land of Christendom."

See also 

 Antidisestablishmentarianism
 Christian nationalism
 Christian state
 Christian Reconstructionism
 History of Christian flags
 Theonomy
 Pan-Islamism

References 

Christianity and politics
Christian terminology